Milomir Sivčević (born 1 January 1979) is a Serbian football defender.

Born in Teslić, SR Bosnia and Herzegovina, he played with Serbian side Cement Beočin before moving to Slovakia.

References

External links
 at mfkruzomberok.sk 

1979 births
Living people
People from Teslić
Serbs of Bosnia and Herzegovina
Serbian footballers
Serbian expatriate footballers
Association football defenders
FK Cement Beočin players
MŠK Rimavská Sobota players
MFK Ružomberok players
MFK Dolný Kubín players
Slovak Super Liga players
2. Liga (Slovakia) players
5. Liga players
Expatriate footballers in Slovakia
Serbian expatriate sportspeople in Slovakia